Poggiardo is a town and comune in the Italian province of Lecce in the Apulia region of south-east Italy. An old Messapian town, Vaste, is located in its territory as a frazione.

References

Cities and towns in Apulia
Localities of Salento